Graphium ucalegon, the creamy graphium, is a butterfly in the family Papilionidae (swallowtails). It is found in Nigeria, Cameroon, Equatorial Guinea, Gabon, the Republic of the Congo, Angola, the Central African Republic, the Democratic Republic of the Congo, Uganda and Tanzania. Its habitat consists of primary forests.

Adults are on wing mainly just before the beginning of the rain season. Adult males mud-puddle, but have also been observed feeding on rotten fish.

Subspecies
Graphium ucalegon ucalegon (western Nigeria, Cameroon, Equatorial Guinea, Gabon, Congo, north-western Angola, Central African Republic, Democratic Republic of the Congo)
Graphium ucalegon fonteinei Berger, 1981   (Democratic Republic of the Congo: Sankuru, Kabinda, Lomami, Lualaba)
Graphium ucalegon schoutedeni Berger, 1950  (eastern Democratic Republic of the Congo, western Uganda, north-western Tanzania)

Taxonomy
Graphium ucalegon belongs to a species group with 16 members. All are very similar
The species group members are:
Graphium abri Smith & Vane-Wright, 2001 
Graphium adamastor  (Boisduval, 1836) 
Graphium agamedes (Westwood, 1842)
Graphium almansor (Honrath, 1884)
Graphium auriger (Butler, 1876) 
Graphium aurivilliusi (Seeldrayers, 1896)
Graphium fulleri  (Grose-Smith, 1883)
Graphium hachei (Dewitz, 1881)
Graphium kigoma Carcasson, 1964
Graphium olbrechtsi Berger, 1950
Graphium poggianus (Honrath, 1884)
Graphium rileyi Berger, 1950
Graphium schubotzi (Schultze, 1913)
Graphium simoni (Aurivillius, 1899),
Graphium ucalegon (Hewitson, 1865)[
Graphium ucalegonides (Staudinger, 1884)

References

Carcasson, R.H. 1960 "The Swallowtail Butterflies of East Africa (Lepidoptera, Papilionidae)". Journal of the East Africa Natural History Society pdf Key to East Africa members of the species group, diagnostic and other notes and figures. (Permission to host granted by The East Africa Natural History Society

ucalegon
Butterflies of Africa
Butterflies described in 1865
Taxa named by William Chapman Hewitson